Aramazd Stepanian (born October 11, 1951) is an Armenian actor, producer, director and playwright born in Abadan, Iran. He is the owner of the Luna Playhouse where he also serves as the artistic director and producer. He was also a former candidate for Los Angeles, California City Council.

References

External links
 Personal Website
 Luna Playhouse

1951 births
Living people
People from Abadan, Iran
Iranian people of Armenian descent
Iranian emigrants to the United States
American male actors
Ethnic Armenian male actors
Iranian male actors
American writers of Iranian descent